Mansoor Ghamil Al-Nuaimi (born 13 February 1989), commonly known as Mansoor Al-Nuaimi, is an Omani footballer who plays for Al-Nahda Club.

Club career statistics

International career
Mansoor is part of the first team squad of the Oman national football team. He was selected for the national team for the first time in 2009. He made his first appearance for Oman on 17 November 2009 in a friendly match against Brazil. He has made an appearance in the 2011 AFC Asian Cup qualification.

Honours

Club
Oman Professional League (1): 2013-14
Sultan Qaboos Cup (0): Runner-up 2012, 2013
Oman Super Cup (2): 2009, 2014

References

External links

1989 births
Living people
Omani footballers
Oman international footballers
Association football forwards
Al-Nahda Club (Oman) players
Oman Professional League players